Testosterone benzoate, or testosterone 17β-benzoate, also known as androst-4-en-17β-ol-3-one 17β-benzoate, is a synthetic, injected anabolic–androgenic steroid (AAS) and an androgen ester – specifically, the benzoate C17β ester of testosterone – which was never marketed. It is a prodrug of testosterone and, when administered via intramuscular injection, is associated with a long-lasting depot effect and extended duration of action. The drug was first described in 1936 and was the first androgen ester and ester of testosterone to be synthesized.

See also 
 List of androgen esters

References 

Abandoned drugs
Androgens and anabolic steroids
Androstanes
Benzoate esters
Enones
Prodrugs
Testosterone esters